Top 20 Cambridge Schools in Zimbabwe

Zimbabwe education-related lists
2014 in Zimbabwe